Gabriel Alejandro Villamil Cortez (born 28 June 2001) is a Bolivian football player. He plays for Bolívar.

International career
He made his debut for Bolivia national football team on 9 September 2021 in a World Cup qualifier against Argentina.

References

External links
 
 
 

2001 births
Footballers from La Paz
Living people
Bolivian footballers
Bolivia international footballers
Association football midfielders
Club Bolívar players
Bolivian Primera División players